Lisa Unruh (born 12 April 1988) is a German athlete who competes in recurve archery.

Unruh represented Germany at the 2016 Summer Olympics in Rio de Janeiro winning the silver medal. Her Silver medal was the first individual medal in archery her country has ever won at the Olympic Games.

She represented Germany at the 2020 Summer Olympics, winning a bronze medal in the team archery event.

Career 
Lisa Unruh started internationally in 2006, at the European Championships in 2006 she got the German team to fourth place. Unruh has won team medals at European and World Indoor Championships and World Cup stages, and an individual medal at the 2012 Indoor World Cup. In 2014, she qualified for the World Cup Final in Lausanne for the first time.

In 2017, Unruh won the gold medal at The World Games 2017 in Wroclaw, Poland.

References

External links
 
 
 
 
 

1988 births
Living people
German female archers
Archers at the 2015 European Games
European Games competitors for Germany
Olympic archers of Germany
Archers at the 2016 Summer Olympics
World Archery Championships medalists
Medalists at the 2016 Summer Olympics
Medalists at the 2020 Summer Olympics
Olympic silver medalists for Germany
Olympic bronze medalists for Germany
Olympic medalists in archery
World Games gold medalists
Competitors at the 2017 World Games
Archers at the 2019 European Games
Competitors at the 2009 World Games
World Games medalists in archery
Archers at the 2020 Summer Olympics
21st-century German women